The 1986 Copa del Rey was the 50th edition of the Spanish basketball Cup. It was organized by the ACB and its Final Eight was played in Barcelona, in the Palau Blaugrana between 17 and 19 December 1986.

This edition was played by the two first qualified teams of the 1986–87 ACB first stage.

Qualified teams

Group Odd

|}

Group Even

|}

Bracket

Final

References

External links
Boxscores at ACB.com
Linguasport

Copa del Rey de Baloncesto
Copa